Canal 3 is a Burkina Faso television channel. The channel began broadcasting on March 20, 2000.

External links

Television stations in Burkina Faso
Television channels and stations established in 2000